Gino Infantino (born 19 May 2003) is an Argentine professional footballer who plays as an attacking midfielder for Rosario Central.

Club career
Infantino spent his early years with Villa del Parque. He soon moved to Renato Cesarini, remaining for six years; a period that saw him have a trial with Real Madrid. Aged eleven, Infantino joined ADIUR. After four years, which included a trial with Villarreal, the attacking midfielder headed to Rosario Central in 2018. He made his first-team breakthrough in mid-2020, initially featuring in the club's pre-season campaign under manager Kily González. Infantino was then an unused substitute for Copa de la Liga Profesional matches with Godoy Cruz and River Plate, prior to making his senior debut on 13 November against Banfield.

International career
Infantino represented Argentina at various youth levels. In August 2017, he was selected to train with the U15s. January 2019 saw a call-up for the U16s.

Career statistics
.

Notes

References

External links

2003 births
Living people
Footballers from Rosario, Santa Fe
Argentine people of Italian descent
Argentine footballers
Association football midfielders
Rosario Central footballers
Argentina youth international footballers